Azpiazu or Azpiazú is a surname. Notable people with the surname include:

Don Azpiazú (1893–1943), Cuban orchestral director 
Pedro María Azpiazu (born 1957), Spanish Basque politician